The 2016–17 season is Hartlepool United's 108th year in existence and their fourth consecutive season in League Two. Along with competing in League Two, the club will also participate in the FA Cup, League Cup and League Trophy.

The season covers the period from 1 July 2016 to 30 June 2017.

Players

Current squad

Transfers

Transfers in

Transfers out

Loans in

Loans out

Competitions

Pre-season friendlies

League Two

League table

Results summary

Results by matchday

Matches
On 22 June 2016, the fixtures for the forthcoming season were announced.

FA Cup

EFL Cup
On 22 June 2016, the first round draw was made, Hartlepool United were drawn away against Preston North End.

EFL Trophy

Squad statistics

Appearances and goals

|}

Goalscorers

Clean Sheets

Suspensions

References

Hartlepool United
Hartlepool United F.C. seasons
2010s in County Durham